Reuben Mourad (born 22 November 1983) is a journalist, restaurant critic, and television host.

Career
Reuben Mourad is an international television host, food journalist, and restaurant critic. He is currently an on screen personality and host on Australia's Network Ten, and on Australia's radio Smooth FM. As an internationally published food journalist and restaurant critic, his work has appeared in The Daily Meal, MSN, The Huffington Post, Los Angeles Times, and Chicago Tribune.

An Australian Film Television and Radio School (AFTRS) graduate, Mourad has worked with the Australian Radio Network and Seven Network and has been seen on Foxtel & Austar's The Weather Channel as a host through Australia's XYZ Networks.

Mourad is also an international voice over artist, and along with voicing numerous globally broadcast projects, has featured as the live voice for numerous events, including the NBL Championships, Melbourne 2006 Commonwealth Games, 2007 FINA World Championships, Inside Film Awards and ASTRA Awards.

In August 2008, a national newspaper-run poll placed Mourad as the 26th-most "desirable" person on Australian television. In 2013, he was also a finalist for CLEO magazine's Bachelor of the Year competition. He has also been appointed as an Australia Day Ambassador.

On 5 February 2012, Mourad joined Network Ten's new Breakfast program Breakfast as a presenter. in 2012, he also replaced Magdalena Roze as weather presenter on Ten News at Five: Weekend and has also filled in for her as weather presenter on Breakfast and Ten Morning News. He was also the fill in weather presenter for Sydney's Ten News at Five.

External links

Reuben Mourad's Showreel (Video, Audio and Contact Details)
The Weather Channel On-air Team

References

Australian television presenters
1983 births
Living people
Australian Film Television and Radio School alumni
People educated at Saint Ignatius' College, Riverview
Australian LGBT journalists
Australian LGBT broadcasters